

Films

1967 in LGBT history
LGBT
1967
1967